Santo Domingo is a neighbourhood (barrio) of Asunción, Paraguay.

Notable residents
Horacio Cartes, current president of Paraguay.

Neighbourhoods of Asunción